Yves-Alain Barde FRS is a Professor of Neurobiology at Cardiff University. He was elected a Fellow of the Royal Society (FRS) in 2017.

Barde was awarded the IPSEN prize, the Ameritec Foundation Award and the Perl-UNC Prize. He is a member of the European Molecular Biology Organization and External Member of the Max Planck Institute of Neurobiology.

Academic publications 
Barde is the author of hundreds of academic publications which have been cited over 42,000 times according to Google Scholar.

Selected works 

 Physiology of the neurotrophins, GR Lewin, YA Barde, Annual review of neuroscience 19 (1), 289-317, 1996.
Purification of a new neurotrophic factor from mammalian brain., YA Barde, D Edgar, H Thoenen, The EMBO journal 1 (5), 549-553, 1982.
Trophic factors and neuronal survival, YA Barde, Neuron 2 (6), 1525-1534, 1989.

External links 

 Yves-Alain Barde on Google Scholar
Cardiff University Profile

References 

Fellows of the Royal Society
Members of the European Molecular Biology Organization
Living people
Year of birth missing (living people)